Peter Kazaras is an American stage director, artistic director and opera singer (tenor) from New York City.

Career 
Kazaras holds an undergraduate degree in government. Before his career in opera, he worked in a law firm. He served as Artistic Director for the Seattle Opera Young Artist Program from 2006 to 2013.

He is Professor of Music and Director of Opera at University of California, Los Angeles.

Education 
 Riverdale Country School, Bronx, New York, 1969
 New York University School of Law, 1977

Opera

Operas staged

Operatic roles 

 Loge, Der Ring des Nibelungen
 Erik, Der Fliegende Holländer
Monsieur Grivet, Thérèse Raquin (2001 premiere cast)
Pelegrin, New Year (1989 premiere cast)
François, A Quiet Place (1983 premiere cast)

Competition jury member 
José Iturbi International Music Competition (2010)
Marilyn Horne Song Competition

Filmography 
The Ghosts of Versailles (Brian Large, 1992)

References

External links 
 Peter Kazaras, Operabase
 Peter Kazaras, Uzan International Artists

Living people
Place of birth missing (living people)
Year of birth missing (living people)
American opera directors
UCLA Herb Alpert School of Music faculty
New York University School of Law alumni
American operatic tenors
20th-century American male opera singers
21st-century American male opera singers
Riverdale Country School alumni